The South East England Development Agency (SEEDA), was one of a number of regional development agencies in England. It was set up as a non-departmental public body in 1999 to promote the region and to enable a number of more difficult regeneration projects which otherwise might not take place. It covered Berkshire, Buckinghamshire, East Sussex, Hampshire, the Isle of Wight, Kent, Oxfordshire, Surrey and West Sussex

The government announced that SEEDA was due to close by 31 March 2012, along with the other RDAs (regional development agencies).  According to SEEDA's website "Responsibility for economic development and regeneration in England is being passed onto successor bodies, including Local Enterprise Partnerships (LEPs) and central Government departments".

Projects
Projects include:
A number in the Thames Gateway area;
Regeneration of the Kent Coalfield;
Development plans for the Ashford area;
A plan for the regeneration of Hastings and Bexhill, including town centre improvements, new housing and the development of a new university;
The 'Building for Nature' advisory service, which aims to help developers produce projects in the most environmentally-friendly way;
Helping and advising farmers and rural businesses;
A broadband programme to ensure more remote businesses and residences have high speed internet access;
Supporting start-up businesses at enterprise hubs (eventually 30 are planned): 
 Aylesbury Vale Enterprise Hub, based at Buckingham
 Canterbury Enterprise Hub, based at Canterbury
 Eastbourne Enterprise Hub, based at Eastbourne
 Farnborough Enterprise Hub, based at Farnborough and launched July 19, 2006
 Food Technology Enterprise Hub, based at Reading
 Gatwick Diamond Enterprise Hub, based at Crawley
 East Sussex Enterprise Hub, based at Eastbourne and Hastings
 High Wycombe Enterprise Hub, based at High Wycombe
 Isle of Wight Enterprise Hub, based at Newport on the Isle of Wight
 Medway Enterprise Hub, based at Chatham
 Milton Keynes Enterprise Hub, based at Milton Keynes
 Newbury Enterprise Hub, based at Newbury
 Oxfordshire Enterprise Hub, based in Bicester and Harwell
 Reading Enterprise Hub, based on the Whiteknights Campus of the University of Reading in Reading
 Sittingbourne Enterprise Hub, based on the Kent Science Park near Sittingbourne
 Slough Enterprise Hub, based at Slough
 Solent Enterprise Hub, based at Portsmouth
 Southampton Enterprise Hub, based at Southampton
 Surrey Enterprise Hub, based at Guildford
Supporting existing businesses through 16 'enterprise gateways' (eventually 20 are planned): Adur (based in Shoreham-by-Sea), Arun & Littlehampton (primarily covers Bognor Regis and Littlehampton), Chilterns (based in High Wycombe, gives particular support to bespoke furniture makers), East Kent (based in Dover), Faringdon (covers rural west Oxfordshire), Folkestone, Medway, Milton Keynes, Newhaven, Reading, Romney, Rural Hampshire, Slough, South East Hampshire (covers Fareham, Gosport, Havant and Portsmouth), Southampton and Surrey.

See also
Thames Gateway
Regional development agency
South East England Regional Assembly

References

External links
SEEDA
Enterprise Hubs website
Solent Enterprise Hub website

Regional development agencies
Department for Business, Innovation and Skills
1999 establishments in England